Sir Donald Bradman Oration is an Australian Cricket calendar event which honours the career, contribution and memory of one of the proclaimed greatest-ever cricketers, Sir Don Bradman. 

The function provides a platform for a prominent national or international figure to reflect on Sir Donald's career, and on cricket's place in their own lives and the life of the nation. The Honourable John Howard delivered the inaugural oration in August 2000 in his capacity as Australia's prime minister. The 11th Bradman Oration was delivered by former England captain Mike Brearley.

Background
Although his playing career ended more than half a century ago, Sir Donald Bradman remains Australian cricket's most rewarded and influential figure. His contribution as a player, a leader, and an administrator transcended cultures and generational divides, and extended right across the international cricket community.

The Sir Donald Bradman Oration was established by Cricket Australia in 2000 as a means of marking that contribution, and recognising the role that cricket has played in shaping Australian culture and the Australian way of life.

The Oration permits a significant national or sporting identity the opportunity to recognise Sir Donald's unique and profound impact upon the sport on and off the field over a period of more than seven decades. It also provides the keynote speaker with the chance to honour and celebrate his place in Australian history more generally.

Events

See also

 MCC Spirit of Cricket Cowdrey Lecture
 Sir Donald Bradman
 Cricket in Australia

References

External links
 Sir Donald Bradman Oration website

Cricket culture
Don Bradman